Deudorix dariaves, the black-and-orange playboy, is a butterfly of the family Lycaenidae. It is found from South Africa to Mozambique and to the coast of Kenya. In South Africa it is found along the coast of KwaZulu-Natal and north along the escarpment foothill forests to Mpumalanga and Limpopo.

The wingspan is 23–25 mm for males and 28–33 mm for females. Adults are on wing year-round with peaks in September and from April to June.

The larvae feed on the fruit of Deinbollia oblongifolia and Hyperacanthus amoenus. It has also been recorded on Brachystegia and Coffea species

References

External links
Die Gross-Schmetterlinge der Erde 13: Die Afrikanischen Tagfalter. Plate XIII 66 c

Butterflies described in 1877
Butterflies of Africa
Taxa named by William Chapman Hewitson
Deudorix